Star Smuggler is a 1982 board game published by Heritage/Dwarfstar.

Gameplay
Star Smuggler is a solitaire game in which the player, as the character Duke Springer, seeks to make his fortune by trading whatever goods and services come to hand in the ten-system Pavonis Sector.

Reception
Steve List reviewed Star Smuggler in The Space Gamer No. 60. List commented that "It is an interesting, if not altogether successful, attempt at creating a one-player RPG. My qualified recommendation is to give it a look.  You just might like it."

Reviews
Dragon #66

References

Board games introduced in 1982
Heritage Models games